Otto Puhlman (June 12, 1837April 26, 1924) was a German American businessman and Democratic politician.  He was the first mayor of Plymouth, Wisconsin, and served six additional terms as mayor.  He represented much of western Sheboygan County in the Wisconsin State Assembly during the 1873 session.  Earlier, he served as a Union Army officer in the American Civil War.

Biography

Otto Pulman was born in Görzke, in what is now eastern Germany.  At the time of his birth, it was the Province of Brandenburg in the Kingdom of Prussia.  He was raised and educated there, and attended Heidelberg University.  In 1859, Puhlman emigrated to the United States and settled in Plymouth, Wisconsin, where he started a flour mill.

At the outbreak of the American Civil War, Puhlman was among the first volunteers for the Union Army from Wisconsin.  He was enrolled as a sergeant in Co. C of the 4th Wisconsin Infantry Regiment and served with that regiment through the first year of the war, on garrison duty in Maryland.  In February 1862, he was commissioned second lieutenant of Co. G in the 19th Wisconsin Infantry Regiment and returned to Wisconsin for the organization of that regiment.

The 19th Wisconsin Infantry was assigned to guard Confederate prisoners at Camp Randall until May 1862, and then headed to Washington, D.C., in June for service in the eastern theater of the war.  They were assigned to the Union garrison at Norfolk, Virginia, and participated in several of the sieges and battles along Virginia's Atlantic coast.  In the Spring of 1864, they were assigned to XVIII Corps and proceeded up the James River to join the Siege of Petersburg.  After nine months entrenched around Petersburg and Richmond, Virginia, they took the cities in April 1865, and were then assigned to garrison duty in northern Virginia until the end of the war.  Puhlman was promoted to first lieutenant in June 1863, and captain in April 1864.

During the American Civil War, Puhlman served in the 19th Wisconsin Volunteer Infantry Regiment. Puhlman served as mayor of Plymouth, Wisconsin. In 1873, Puhlman served in the Wisconsin State Assembly and was a Democrat. In 1885, Puhlman sold his business and moved to Sanborn, Iowa, where he started a new mill. In 1887, Puhlman moved to Chicago, Illinois, and worked for the Chicago & Northwestern Railway Company until 1912. Puhlman died at a soldiers sanitarium in Sawtelle, California. He was buried in Plymouth, Wisconsin.

References

|-

1837 births
1924 deaths
German emigrants to the United States
People from the Province of Brandenburg
People from O'Brien County, Iowa
People from Plymouth, Wisconsin
Politicians from Chicago
Heidelberg University alumni
Businesspeople from Iowa
Businesspeople from Wisconsin
Mayors of places in Wisconsin
People of Wisconsin in the American Civil War
Union Army officers
Democratic Party members of the Wisconsin State Assembly